Bobritzsch may refer to:

Bobritzsch (municipality), former municipality in Saxony, Germany
Bobritzsch-Hilbersdorf, merger of the municipalities Bobritzsch and Hilbersdorf in 2012
Bobritzsch (river), a river of Saxony, Germany